Apple is an unincorporated community located near Hugo Lake and State Highway 93 in Choctaw County, Oklahoma, United States.

References

Unincorporated communities in Choctaw County, Oklahoma
Unincorporated communities in Oklahoma